The 2001–02 season was the 100th in the history of the Western Football League.

The league champions for the sixth time in their history were Bideford, but runners-up Taunton Town took promotion to the Southern League. The champions of Division One were Frome Town.

Final tables

Premier Division
The Premier Division remained at 20 clubs after Chippenham Town were promoted to the Southern League, Minehead Town were relegated to the First Division, and two clubs joined:

Keynsham Town, runners-up in the First Division.
Team Bath, champions of the First Division.

First Division
The First Division remained at 20 clubs after Team Bath and Keynsham Town were promoted to the Premier Division, Pewsey Vale transferred to the Hellenic League, and three clubs joined:

Minehead Town, relegated from the Premier Division.
Shepton Mallet, promoted from the Somerset Senior League.
Willand Rovers, promoted from the Devon County League.
Worle St Johns F.C. changed their name to Weston St Johns F.C.

References

2001-02
8